Diego Henao (born 9 January 1947) is a Colombian diver. He competed at the 1964 Summer Olympics, the 1968 Summer Olympics and the 1972 Summer Olympics.

References

1947 births
Living people
Colombian male divers
Olympic divers of Colombia
Divers at the 1964 Summer Olympics
Divers at the 1968 Summer Olympics
Divers at the 1972 Summer Olympics
Place of birth missing (living people)
Pan American Games bronze medalists for Colombia
Pan American Games medalists in diving
Divers at the 1967 Pan American Games
Divers at the 1971 Pan American Games
Medalists at the 1967 Pan American Games
Medalists at the 1971 Pan American Games
20th-century Colombian people